Pennyhill (also known as Penny Hill) is an unincorporated community in New Castle County, Delaware, United States. Pennyhill is located north of U.S. Route 13 Business and west of Delaware Route 3, northeast of Wilmington. Delaware State Police Troop 1 is located in Pennyhill.

Pennyhill is more commonly known as Ridgewood, consisting of Ridgewood Circle and the adjacent Lynn streets.

References

External links

Unincorporated communities in New Castle County, Delaware
Unincorporated communities in Delaware